Amaxia pseudodyuna is a moth of the family Erebidae. It was described by Walter Rothschild in 1922. It is found in Brazil.

References

Moths described in 1922
Amaxia
Moths of South America